Bowling for the 2013 Asian Indoor and Martial Arts Games was held in the Anyang Hogye Gymnasium. It took place from 30 June to 6 July 2013. This was the third time that this sport is in these Games after Macau 2007 and Hanoi 2009.

Medalists

Men

Women

Medal table

Results

Men

Singles
30 June

Preliminary

Knockout round

Doubles
2 July

Preliminary

Knockout round

Team of 4

Preliminary
4–5 July

Knockout round
6 July

Women

Singles
1 July

Preliminary

Knockout round

Doubles
3 July

Preliminary

Knockout round

Team of 4

Preliminary
4–5 July

Knockout round
6 July

References

Results

External links
 

2013
Asian Indoor and Martial Arts Games, 2013
2013 Asian Indoor and Martial Arts Games events